Derek Symonds (11 October 1918 – 6 October 2001) was a former Australian rules footballer who played with Melbourne in the Victorian Football League (VFL).

Notes

External links 

1918 births
Australian rules footballers from Victoria (Australia)
Melbourne Football Club players
2001 deaths